The Indian Century is the idea that the 21st century will be dominated by India, as the 20th century is often called the American Century, and the 19th century as Pax Britannica (British Peace). The phrase is used particularly in the assertion that the economy of India could overtake the economy of the United States and economy of China as the largest national economy in the world, a position it held from 1 to 1500 CE and from 1600 to 1700 CE.

India is a member of Build Back Better World and has also created North–South Transport Corridor as an alternative to the Belt and Road Initiative policy initiative of China (PRC), to link in with Iran, Russia, the Caucasus, and Central Asia. In 2017, India and Japan joined together to form Asia-Africa Growth Corridor, to better integrate the economies of South, Southeast, and East Asia with Oceania and Africa. India also engages in Quadrilateral Security Dialogue and Malabar (naval exercise) for China containment policy.

According to the report named "Indian Century: Defining India's Place in a Rapidly Changing Global Economy" by IBM Institute for Business Value, India is predicted to be among the world's highest-growth nations over the coming years.

Factors

One of the key factors includes its populous democracy. As per United Nations report, India will overtake China to become the world's most populous nation by 2022.

Economists and researchers at Harvard University have projected India's 7% projected annual growth rate through 2024 will continue to put it ahead of China, making India the fastest growing major economy in the world. In 2017, the Center for International Development at Harvard University published a research study projecting that India has emerged as the economic pole of global growth by surpassing China and is expected to maintain its lead over the coming decade.

India is very recently being considered a major great power or emerging so (well beyond middle powers) and generally considered an emerging superpower due to its large and stable population and its rapidly growing economic and military sectors.

See also

References

Further reading

 "Is this the Indian century?" The Guardian.
 China's Century — or India's? Time
 India, China to become superpowers in two decades The Economic Times.
 China and India: The Power of Two Harvard Business Review
 "Lesson From Old India" The New York Times
 Dirks, Nicholas (2008) The Scandal of Empire: India and the Creation of Imperial Britain. Belknap Press . 
 Durant, Will (1930) The Case for India. New York: Simon and Schuster.
 
 Kennedy, Paul (1989) The Rise and Fall of the Great Powers. Vintage. . 
 Lak, Daniel (2009) India Express: The Future of the New Superpower. Palgrave Macmillan .
 Luce, Edward (2008) In Spite of the Gods: The Rise of Modern India. Anchor . 
 Marks, Robert (2007) The Origins of the Modern World: A Global and Ecological Narrative from the Fifteenth to the Twenty-first Century. Rowman & Littlefield Publishers . 
 McKinsey & Company Inc. (2013) Reimagining India: Unlocking the Potential of Asia's Next Superpower. Simon & Schuster . 
 Meredith, Robyn (2008) The Elephant and the Dragon: The Rise of India and China and What It Means for All of Us. W. W. Norton & Company . 
 Parthasarathi, Prasannan (2011) Why Europe Grew Rich and Asia Did Not : Global Economic Divergence, 1600–1850. Cambridge University Press . 
 Rothermund, Dietmar (2008) India: The Rise of an Asian Giant. Yale University Press 
 Sieff, Martin (2010) Shifting Superpowers: The New and Emerging Relationships between the United States, China and India. Cato Institute . 
 Smith, Jeff (2013) Cold Peace: China-India Rivalry in the Twenty-First Century. Lexington Books .
 Tharoor, Shashi (2012) Pax Indica: India and the World of the Twenty-First Century. Penguin Global .

External links
 Infographic: Share of world GDP throughout history | Infogram
 How the British Ruined India
 

Global politics
Economy of India
Political neologisms
20th-century neologisms
Foreign relations of India
Economic history of India (1947–present)
Superpowers
Rises to prominence
Indosphere